Nuagaon is a block in the Nayagarh district of Odisha, India. It contains 22 gram panchayats, which in turn include 100 villages.

Location and geography 

References 

Sundergarh district